The Portland–Lewiston Interurban (PLI) was an electric railroad subsidiary of the Androscoggin Electric Company operating from 1914 to 1933 between Monument Square in Portland and Union Square in Lewiston, Maine. Hourly service was offered over the  route between the two cities. Express trains stopping only at West Falmouth, Gray, New Gloucester, Upper Gloucester and Danville made the trip in 80 minutes, while trains making other local stops upon request required 20 minutes more. The line was considered the finest interurban railroad in the state of Maine.

Route and facilities

Summer-season construction began in 1910 including ten reinforced concrete bridges. The longest was a  span over the Presumpscot River There was a  span over the Little Androscoggin River in Auburn and a span of similar length near West Falmouth. Approximately  of  steel rail was laid in  lengths over private right-of-way connecting segments of trackage rights over Portland, Lewiston, and Auburn city streetcar lines. Scheduled interurban service began on 7 July 1914. At Gray, odd-numbered northbound trains took a siding to cross even-numbered southbound trains on the following route from north to south:
 Lewiston  by  brick passenger terminal and 4-track car barn and repair shop on Middle Street
 Fairview Junction with the Auburn streetcar line
 Sadler's siding
 Little Androscoggin River bridge
 Littlefield's Corner crossing of the Grand Trunk Lewiston branch
 bridge over the Maine Central Rumford branch
 Grand Trunk Railway underpass
 Danville siding with combined power substation and passenger shelter
 Upper Gloucester freight platform
 Rowes siding
 New Gloucester
 Penny Road freight shed
 Morse Road freight shed
 Webster's siding
 North Gray freight platform
 Hawkes freight platform
 Gray car storage yard with car barn, freight house, and combined power substation and passenger shelter
 Forest Lake siding (South Gray)
 West Cumberland
 Morrison's Hill gravel pit
 West Falmouth siding with combined power substation and passenger shelter
 Presumpscot River bridge
 Deering Siding for delivery of construction materials, but Maine Central Railroad refused to interchange loaded cars.
 Deering Junction with the Portland streetcar line
 Portland  by  4-track brick car barn between Cumberland Avenue and Portland Street

Rolling stock

Each car contained a  smoking compartment with longitudinal leather seats, and a  compartment with twenty plush cross-seats for non-smoking passengers. Cars were equipped with two trolley poles for operation in either direction. Cars were capable of multiple unit operation, but difficulties operating over municipal streetcar tracks discouraged the practice.

Two more coaches without separate smoking compartments were purchased in 1915. These coaches had less powerful  traction motors and were incapable of the speed required for express service. They were used exclusively for the slower schedules making local stops. Powered box express cars operated as extra trains making two round trips daily handling less than carload freight including cans of raw milk from rural dairy farms to a Portland milk processor. The Baldwin electric locomotive ran on these extra runs with a PLI boxcar when there were a few PLI stock cars of cattle or bulky loads for PLI's ten flatcars.

Powered rolling stock roster

Power

Hydroelectricity provided by the Androscoggin Electric Company Deer Rips generators on the Androscoggin River could be supplemented by a steam power plant in Lewiston. Three-phase 60-cycle power was transmitted to the Danville substation over the 10,000-volt lines used for residential distribution in the Lewiston service area, and was boosted to 33,000 volts at Danville for more efficient transmission to the substations in Gray and Falmouth.

History
Service was interrupted during the spring of 1916 by snowmelt freshets causing extensive washouts between Gray and West Falmouth. Fifty dollars was stolen when the last daily train from Lewiston to Portland was robbed at Fairview Junction on 18 March 1917. Heavy snow collapsed the roof of the Gray car barn on 11 February 1918, but it was rebuilt. Express car 32 and Gladiolus suffered repairable minor damage in a slow head-on collision in Falmouth on 1 March 1918. Androscoggin Electric Company merged into Central Maine Power in 1919. The blizzard of 6 March 1920 caused cancellation of many Maine trains including the PLI cars. The Maine Statehood Centennial Exposition in Portland on 5 July 1920 created the PLI's heaviest daily passenger load. Coach-smoker Maine was purchased for the Exposition, and the box express cars were temporarily fitted with benches to carry all the passengers.

Two extra cars carrying the Auburn high school basketball team and students to a Portland game collided at Deering Junction on 24 January 1924. The following Maine rammed the leading Azalea as it slowed in heavy fog. There were no serious injuries, but the game was cancelled and both cars required repairs. Although the other concrete bridges proved durable, the Presumpscot River bridge was weakened by paper mill waste and required replacement by a steel span in 1927. In September 1929 the competing Androscoggin and Kennebec (A&K) electric railway abandoned its parallel line south of Lewiston in favor of a trackage rights agreement with the PLI. When the A&K completely abandoned its service east of Lewiston to Augusta in July 1932, PLI made an agreement to transfer express at Lewiston to Hodgdon's Motor Express Company highway trucks for continued service to Augusta.

As increasing numbers of riders left PLI cars for automobiles through the 1920s and Great Depression, interurban service ended on 29 June 1933 and the rails were lifted in 1934. The Danville substation was retained by Central Maine Power Company, but the Gray and West Falmouth substations were sold as residential dwellings, and the Lewiston car barn was converted to a Red and White food store. Much of the right-of-way between Portland and West Falmouth was used for the Maine Turnpike; but a portion of the right-of-way through Gray was on planning to be restored for use by the Maine Narrow Gauge Railroad Museum, but those plans were since abandoned and the museum remains in Portland. The interurban car Narcissus has been preserved at the Seashore Trolley Museum.

References

External links

Electric railways in Maine
Defunct Maine railroads
Railway companies established in 1914
Railway companies disestablished in 1933